Xavier Coates (born 12 March 2001) is a Papua New Guinea international rugby league footballer who plays as a er for the Melbourne Storm in the NRL.

He previously played for the Brisbane Broncos. He has played for Queensland in the State of Origin series.

Early life
Coates was born in Port Moresby, Papua New Guinea to a mother from the Gulf Province in PNG and an Australian father. As an infant he moved with his family to Australia and initially spent two years living in Cairns before settling on the Gold Coast.

He attended Marymount College throughout his upbringing and began pursuing an athletics career in primary school. His goal was to represent Papua New Guinea at the Olympics but former NRL player and Marymount teacher Matt Geyer organised a phone call with then-Queensland captain Greg Inglis and the pair convinced Coates to pursue a career in rugby league instead. Coates named Inglis as his sporting idol growing up and was nicknamed 'Little GI' by his Broncos teammates due to the similarities in playing style.

Junior career 
Xavier Coates began playing junior football on the Gold Coast for the Currumbin Eagles in 2010 at the age of 9 years old. Coates never made an underage representative team as a junior, being over looked on multiple occasions. After a brief pursuit of an athletics career, he returned to the field and played part in the Currumbin Eagles' undefeated premiership winning Under-16 team in 2017. This was to be pivotal as on a cold May evening with the Currumbin Eagles playing the Helensvale Hornets a Brisbane Broncos' talent scout had come to view the game as several young Broncos contracted players were playing including Tom Dearden.

The scout only had eyes for one player after the game, Xavier. After being signed to the Bronco's Coates was invited to the Broncos' summer camp where he impressed coaches and trainers and was selected in the 2018 Queensland emerging Under-18 Origin Squad despite being 16 years old and never having played a representative game. Coates was selected in the 2018 Queensland Under-18 State of Origin side who went down to NSW 16-10. 

In 2018, he was instrumental in the Currumbin Eagles' U17 Premiership where he was coached by former Melbourne Storm player Matt Geyer. He also featured in the Mal Meninga Cup with the Tweed Heads Seagulls. In 2019 he was fast tracked to senior rugby league with the Currumbin Eagles, making his Queensland Cup debut for the Tweed Heads Seagulls, however as he was not a contracted Gold Coast Titans player, he was transferred to Broncos' feeder club Redcliffe Dolphins. 

Coates was selected in junior representative teams (Under-18 South Coast) and the Under-18 Queensland Schoolboys squad and once again was selected in the Queensland emerging Under-18 Origin Squad and played in the junior State of Origin match against NSW, where Queensland won the game 34-12, with Coates named player of the match.

Senior career

2019-2021: Brisbane Broncos 
Coates made his international debut for Papua New Guinea in their 24–6 defeat by Samoa in the 2019 Oceania Cup. A month later, in round 16 of the 2019 NRL season he made his NRL debut for the Brisbane Broncos against the Cronulla-Sutherland Sharks, scoring a try.

He made 12 appearances for Brisbane in the 2020 NRL season, a year which saw Brisbane come last for the first time their history. Coates achieved the highest top speed of a player in the 2020 NRL season by hitting a top speed of 36.9 km/h against the Newcastle Knights in round 6 of the 2020 season.

Coates was selected to make his debut for Queensland on the wing in game one of the 2020 State of Origin series, scoring a try in the 18-14 win. Coates then played game two scoring the first try in a 34-10 loss, however was ruled out of game three due to a groin injury suffered in the captain's run before the match.

In round 1 of the 2021 NRL season, he scored two tries for Brisbane in the first half of the match against Parramatta.  In the act of scoring the second try, Coates landed awkwardly on his neck and was taken from the field.  Brisbane would go on to lose the match 24-16.

In round 3 of the 2021 NRL season, he scored two tries in a 24-0 victory over Canterbury-Bankstown.
On 9 May 2021, Coates announced that he had signed a two year deal to join Melbourne Storm for the 2022 and 2023 seasons.

In round 23 of the 2021 NRL season, he scored two tries in a 24-22 victory over the New Zealand Warriors.

2022-present: Melbourne Storm 
In round 1 of the 2022 NRL season, Coates made his club debut for Melbourne on his 21st birthday against Wests Tigers, scoring a try in a win at CommBank Stadium. He had his club debut jersey (cap number 217) presented to him by former Melbourne player Matt Geyer.
In round 7, Coates scored four tries for Melbourne in a 70-10 victory over the New Zealand Warriors.  In the 2022 elimination final, Coates scored a hat-trick in Melbourne's 28-20 loss against Canberra.

Coates would finish the 2022 season with 16 tries from 17 appearances for Melbourne, with an ankle injury suffered in game one of the 2022 State of Origin series sidelining the winger for seven matches.

References

External links
Brisbane Broncos profile 
Melbourne Storm profile

2001 births
Living people
Brisbane Broncos players
Melbourne Storm players
Papua New Guinea national rugby league team players
Papua New Guinean rugby league players
Queensland Rugby League State of Origin players
Rugby league centres
Rugby league wingers
Tweed Heads Seagulls players
Sportspeople from the Gold Coast, Queensland